The Black Viper (aka La vipère noire in France) is a 1908 film directed by D. W. Griffith. The film was made by the American Mutoscope and Biograph Company when it and many other early film studios in America's first motion picture industry were based in Fort Lee, New Jersey at the beginning of the 20th century.

Plot
A thug accosts a girl as she leaves her workplace but a man rescues her. The thug vows revenge and, with the help of two friends, attacks the girl and her rescuer again as they're going for a walk. This time they succeed in kidnapping the rescuer. He is bound and gagged and taken away in a cart. The girl runs home and gets help from several neighbors. They track the ruffians down to a cabin in the mountains where the gang has trapped their victim and set the cabin on fire. A thug and Rescuer fight on the roof of the house.

Cast
 Edward Dillon as Mike
 George Gebhardt as Viper
 Mack Sennett as Rescuer
 D. W. Griffith as Rescuer
 Anthony O'Sullivan as Gang Member

See also
 D. W. Griffith filmography
 List of American films of 1908

References

External links

 D. W. Griffith at http://www.buscabiografias.com
 
The Black Viper available for free download at Internet Archive

1908 films
Films directed by D. W. Griffith
American silent short films
American black-and-white films
1908 drama films
Films shot in Fort Lee, New Jersey
1908 short films
Silent American drama films
Articles containing video clips
1900s English-language films
1900s American films